Lashio is the largest town in northern Shan State, Myanmar, about  north-east of Mandalay. It is situated on a low mountain spur overlooking the valley of the Yaw River.

Lashio is the administrative center of Lashio Township and Lashio District; before April 2010, it was also the administrative center of Shan State (North). The population grew from approximately 5000 in 1960 to 88,590 in 1983. It was estimated at approximately 131,000 in 2009.

The population is made up of mostly Shan, Chinese and Burmans.

History
The British colonial period in this part of the country began in 1887, and the Myanmar Railways line from Mandalay reached Lashio in 1903.

Before British rule Lashio was also the centre of authority for the northern Shan States, but the Burmese post in the valley was close to the Nam Yao, in an old Chinese fortified camp. The Lashio valley was formerly very populous; but a rebellion, started by the sawbwa of Hsenwi, about ten years before the British occupation, ruined it.

In 1900, the town of Lashio consisted of the European station, with court house and quarters for the civil officers; the military police post, the headquarters of the Lashio battalion of military police; and the native station, in which the various nationalities, Shans, Burmans, Hindus and Muslims, who were divided into separate quarters, with reserves for government servants and for the temporary residences of the five sawbwas of the northern Shan States; and a bazaar.

Lashio became important during the Sino-Japanese War resp. World War II as the Burmese terminus of the Burma Road 1938–45. In World War II, Lashio was taken by the Japanese April 29, 1942 and liberated by the Allies March 7, 1945.

Climate
Lashio has a humid subtropical climate (Cwa) according to the Köppen climate classification system, marked by heavy rains from May to October.
The annual rainfall averages . 
Temperatures are generally warm throughout the year, though nights are cool from December to March.

Landmarks
 Yan Tine Aung Pagoda
 Chinese Temple
 Natural Hot spring
 Sarsana Hill
 Mansu Shan Monastery
 Lashio Night Bazaar
 Hu Mon Dam
 Linnoet (bat) cave
 Ye Kan Thaung

Transport
Lashio is located at the end of the Burma Road, and at the terminus of the Mandalay-Kunlong railway. It is also the end point of the government cart road from Mandalay, from which it is  distant.

The scenic Goteik viaduct is near Lashio and trains travelling from Mandalay pass over the bridge, which is the highest bridge in Myanmar.

In 2009, a railway link through to Jiegao in China was proposed. In 2011 the proposal was expanded to a link between Kunming and Kyaukphyu. President Thein Sein's signed a memorandum of understanding during his May 2011 visit to Beijing between Myanmar's rail transport ministry and China's state-owned Railway Engineering Corporation to build the railway.

It is the home of Lashio Airport.

Culture
Religious sites include the "Sasana (Pyilon Chanta) Pagoda" and the "Mansu Pagoda". Yepusan spa is nearly five miles away from the city center, and is healthful in winter. Other than some ethnic minorities group, Lashio is also a town with a large Chinese population. The most famous Chinese temple in the area is "观音山灵峰寺" where many Chinese people visited during the Chinese New Year (Spring Festival). Since 2000, Lashio has been important for border trade between Myanmar and China. .

Sai Mauk Kham, one of the Vice Presidents of Myanmar's democratic government from the 2010 general election, was elected from Lashio constituency.

Education
The town is home to the Lashio University, the Computer University (Lashio), the Technology University (Lashio), the Education College (Lashio) and the Lashio Nursing School.

Gallery

See also
 Lashio Airport
 Lashio Township
 Sino-Myanmar pipelines

References

External links

 Taipei American Chamber of Commerce; Topics Magazine, Analysis, November 2012.  Myanmar: Southeast Asia's Last Frontier for Investment, BY DAVID DUBYNE
 Lashio, April 28, 1942 - Story of War 'Last Man in to Bat'

Populated places in Shan State
Township capitals of Myanmar